Taj Mahal is a Bollywood film. It was released in 1941, directed by Nanubhai Vakil and had Nazir and Suraiya in pivotal roles under the Banner of Sri Meenakshi Pictures. The film's music was by Damodar. Lyricists were Behzad Lakhnavi, S. Khalil and Pandit Anuj. Playback singers were Indurani and Fakir Mohammad.

References

External links
 , Retrieved 4 October 2015

1941 films
1940s Hindi-language films
Indian epic films
Films set in the Mughal Empire
Indian historical films
1940s historical films
Indian black-and-white films
Cultural depictions of Shah Jahan
Films directed by Nanubhai Vakil